This is a list of islands in Scotland with the name Garbh Eilean or similar, meaning "rough island" in Scottish Gaelic.

The largest of these islands are:
Garbh Eilean, Shiant Islands
Garbh Eilean, Loch Maree, in Loch Maree

Smaller islands

Garbh Eilean
Garbh Eilean  in Loch Ròg, Lewis
Garbh Eilean  in Loch Erisort, Lewis
Garbh Eilean, Kylesku  - crossed by the Kylesku bridge
Garbh Eilean  in Coal Rona, south of Rona
Garbh Eilean  in Loch Garry
Garbh Eilean  between Ulva and Little Colonsay
Garbh Eilean  near Uisken, Mull
Garbh Eilean  in Loch Sunart
Garbh Eilean Mòr  between Ronay and Grimsay in the Outer Hebrides
Gairbh Eilein,  Loch Dunvegan

Eilean Garbh
Eilean Garbh  in Strathnaver
Eilean Garbh  in Badcall Bay, Sutherland
Eilean Garbh  in Laggan Bay, between Ulva and Mull

An Garbh-eilean
An Garbh-eilean  in Loch Kishorn
An Garbh-eilean  in Loch nan Uamh, Sound of Arisaig

Innis Garbh/Garbh Innis
Inchgarvie, Firth of Forth, an anglicisation of this term.

Similar names
Garbh Eileach, an island in the Inner Hebrides of the west coast of Scotland
Garvellachs, a small archipelago in the Inner Hebrides of Scotland
Garbh Sgeir, a rock near the islet Òigh-sgeir, in the Small Isles, Lochaber

See also
 Rough Island in the Solway Firth
 List of islands in Scotland

Scottish Island set index articles